Bufonia is a genus of flowering plants belonging to the family Caryophyllaceae.

Its native range is Macaronesia, Europe, Mediterranean to Central Asia.

Species:

Bufonia anatolica 
Bufonia calderae 
Bufonia calyculata 
Bufonia capitata 
Bufonia capsularis 
Bufonia chevalieri 
Bufonia duvaljouvei 
Bufonia elata 
Bufonia enervis 
Bufonia ephedrina 
Bufonia hebecalyx 
Bufonia koelzii 
Bufonia kotschyana 
Bufonia leptoclada 
Bufonia macrocarpa 
Bufonia macropetala 
Bufonia micrantha 
Bufonia multiceps 
Bufonia murbeckii 
Bufonia oliveriana 
Bufonia pabotii 
Bufonia paniculata 
Bufonia parviflora 
Bufonia perennis 
Bufonia ramonensis 
Bufonia sintenisii 
Bufonia stapfii 
Bufonia stricta 
Bufonia takhtajanii 
Bufonia tenuifolia 
Bufonia virgata 
Bufonia yildirimhanii

References

Caryophyllaceae
Caryophyllaceae genera